Thin Air is British singer-songwriter Peter Hammill's 32nd solo album, released on his own Fie! Records label in June 2009. It was additionally made available as digital download through Burning Shed Records.

As on his previous release, Singularity, Hammill played all instruments, wrote all the songs and produced the album.

The main theme of the album is disappearance, as Hammill told British music magazine Mojo in February 2009: "it became apparent fairly quickly that strong thematic links were running through the songs' lyrics: disappearance, change, loss, dislocation in various forms were stitched through all of them."

Another topic reappearing in several songs is the one of the World Trade Center along with images of planes, though Hammill denied "any direct" reference to 9/11.

According to François Couture of AllMusic, Thin Air: "... may be less experimental than Singularity, but bleaker – and a more cohesive, consistent artistic proposition." The songs contain "almost no percussion, just acoustic guitars, piano, some gnarly electric guitar lines, bass, and those massed and intertwined back vocals that have become his signature".

The album's cover was again created by Paul Ridout, using stills from his video work "Minutely Observed Horizon".

Track listing 
All tracks composed by Peter Hammill

"The Mercy" – 6:21
"Your Face on the Street" – 5:21
"Stumbled" – 4:48
"Wrong Way Round" – 2:40
"Ghosts of Planes" – 5:23
"If We Must Part Like This" – 4:38
"Undone" – 4:25
"Diminished" – 6:11
"The Top of the World Club" – 7:03

Personnel
 Peter Hammill – vocals

Technical
Peter Hammill – recording engineer, mixing (Terra Incognita, Wiltshire)
Paul Ridout – design, photography

Your Face on the Street
While living in Bath, Hammill had the inspiration for the song "Your Face on the Street" from the disappearance of Melanie Hall in the same city. Some of the song's lyrics were written at the time of Hall's disappearance, and when the album came out, the discovery of her remains had yet to be made.

Notes

External links
 Notes and information on Peter Hammill's website
 

2009 albums
Peter Hammill albums